Cornelia Frida Katz, after her wedding in 1937: Cornelia Frida barones Mackay-Katz, (Amsterdam, 29 July 1885 – Aerdenhout, 30 March 1963) was a Dutch lawyer and Christian Historical Union politician. She was the first female member of Parliament to come from a Protestant Christian party (1922). She was also a member of the municipal council of Amsterdam. Katz was a supporter of the introduction of women's suffrage; she joined the women's movement and became order commissioner at the International Congress for Women's Suffrage in 1904 and in 1909 she became a member of the Amsterdam Department of the Women's Suffrage Union.

References

External links 
 Mr. C.F. (Frida) Katz, Parlement.com

1885 births
1963 deaths
20th-century Dutch lawyers
20th-century Dutch politicians
20th-century Dutch women politicians
20th-century women lawyers
Baronesses of the Netherlands
Christian Historical Union politicians
Dutch women lawyers
Dutch women's rights activists
Members of the House of Representatives (Netherlands)
Municipal councillors of Amsterdam